Doris Schröder-Köpf ( Köpf; born 5 August 1963) is a German journalist and politician. She was the fourth wife of former German chancellor Gerhard Schröder. Her articles have been published in newspapers and magazines including Bild and Focus.

Personal life

Köpf and partner Sven Kuntze moved to New York City in 1990, where they had a daughter named Klara in the following year. Soon after the birth the pair separated and Köpf moved back to Bavaria with the child. In October 1997, Köpf married Gerhard Schröder, then Minister-President of Lower Saxony. The couple adopted three year old Viktoria from Saint Petersburg in 2004, and a boy named Gregor in 2006. 

They separated in March 2015, and divorced in January 2018.

Political career
In April 2013, Schröder-Köpf was elected as a member of the Landtag of Lower Saxony for the Social Democratic Party (SPD), where she serves on the Committee on Internal Affairs and Sports as well as on its Sub-Committee on Media. In addition, she was appointed State Commissioner of Migration and Immigration issues for Lower Saxony in the state government of Minister-President Stephan Weil.

Other activities
 Willy Brandt Prize, Member of the Jury
 Niedersächsische Lotto-Sport-Stiftung, Member of the Board of Trustees

References

Other sources

1963 births
Spouses of chancellors of Germany
German journalists
German women journalists
20th-century German journalists
21st-century German journalists
Members of the Landtag of Lower Saxony
Living people
People from Neuburg an der Donau
Gerhard Schröder
Bild people